Juma Marhoon Juma Al-Habsi (born on 28 January 1996), is an Oman professional football player who plays for Al-Khor and the Omani national team.

He debuted internationally with Oman's U-19 team on 10 October 2014 at the 2014 AFC U-19 Championship held in Myanmar in a 6–0 defeat to Iraq.

He also appeared with the U-23 team on 9 January 2018, where he played at the 2018 AFC U-23 Championship in  China in a match against China in a 3–0 defeat.

Al-Habsi made his senior debut on 25 March 2021 in a friendly match against India in a 1–1 draw.

He last appeared at the 2022 World Cup qualifying match against Japan in a 1–0 defeat, before being called up to the final 23-man squad for the 2021 FIFA Arab Cup in Qatar on 18 November 2021. He played the full match against Iraq in a 1–1 draw.

References

1996 births
Living people
Omani footballers
Omani expatriate footballers
Oman international footballers
Association football defenders
Al-Seeb Club players
Al-Khor SC players
Oman Professional League players
Qatar Stars League players
Expatriate footballers in Qatar
Omani expatriate sportspeople in Qatar